Coetan Arthur dolmen, also known as Arthur's Quoit (not to be confused with Carreg Coetan Arthur, near Newport) is the remains of a Neolithic burial chamber (also known as a quoit). It dates from around 3000 BCE. The site, situated on the hillside close to St Davids Head in Pembrokeshire, Wales, is the collapsed chamber of what is presumed to be a passage grave which also has a round barrow. The massive capstone measures approximately 6 metres by 2.5 metres and is supported on one side by an orthostat approximately 1.5 metres in height.

The headland is in the care of the National Trust and the site is a scheduled ancient monument.

Notes

External links

Coetan Arthur on the Megalithic Portal
Coetan Arthur Images on CBHC.gov.uk

Prehistoric sites in Pembrokeshire
Dolmens in Wales
Tourist attractions in Pembrokeshire
Monuments and memorials in Pembrokeshire